Henry Todd Van Dellen (born April 24, 1964) is an American politician in the state of Minnesota. He served in the Minnesota House of Representatives.

References

1964 births
Living people
People from Plymouth, Minnesota
Politicians from Springfield, Missouri
Minnesota lawyers
Republican Party members of the Minnesota House of Representatives
University of Minnesota Law School alumni
University of North Dakota alumni